The Westcott Reservoir was an open  reservoir that has since been replaced by twin 32 million gallon tanks, serving the City of Syracuse, New York. The reservoir's location was originally outside the city limits but a shoestring annexation extended the city border to include it.  A U.S. Environmental Protection Agency (EPA) grant in 2005 was to replace the deteriorated Hypalon lining; as of October 2005 the reservoir stood empty.

Recreation
An open grassy hillside descends from the reservoir all around, with the north end facing onto West Genesee Street having the tallest and longest slope, popular for sledding in the winter. The reservoir is considered to be the best place for sledding in the entire Syracuse area, despite the "No Sledding" signs posted along the fence at the top of the hill. On January 10, 2009, 12-year-old Taylor Denson was sledding down the reservoir when she couldn't stop herself and slammed head first into a parked car. She sustained severe head injuries and died 3 days later. As a result, the city of Syracuse proposed that an orange fence be put up around the reservoir to further prohibit sledding, and to keep people safe.

Hang-gliders, when the sport was new, used to test fly off the North side although there is no safe direction to go; at least one hang-glider has been seriously injured upon ensnaring in power lines over West Genesee St.

Semi-flat areas along the West side are used for softball and other sports. Local schools, such as Westhill High School, often hold practices on the premises for cross Country.

History
The reservoir was built in 1930.

Marijuana was occasionally smoked with some impunity there, any law enforcement arriving would have a long steep climb and be seen from far above. A fence was erected just outside the ring roadway to prevent access in 1973. Unfortunately that also prevents use of the terrace by joggers and as a staging area for the sledding in winter. The area is also the sight of illegal joyriding for local teenagers.

See also
 List of reservoirs and dams in New York
 Woodland Reservoir

References

External links
 http://www.city-data.com/picfilesv/picv2507.php has a picture from the South.  The terrace ring is visible.
 https://web.archive.org/web/20051214143112/http://newtimes.rway.com/1998/best1998/sports.htm  Rated "Best Place to Sled" by a local newspaper.

Reservoirs in New York (state)
Protected areas of Onondaga County, New York
Reservoirs in Onondaga County, New York